Hon Chew Hee (1906 – 1993) was an American muralist, watercolorist and printmaker who was born in Kahului, on the Hawaiian island of Maui in 1906.  He grew up in China, where he received his early training in Chinese brush painting.  He returned to the United States in 1920 at age 14 in order to further his training at the San Francisco Art Institute, receiving that school's highest academic honor.  He then taught in China until moving to Hawaii in 1935.  In Hawaii, he worked as a freelance artist and held classes in both Western and Eastern styles of painting.  Together with Isami Doi (1903–1965), Hee taught painting classes at the YMCA.  At this time, Doi instructed the young artist in woodcarving techniques and Hee, like his master, created wood engravings drawn from the rural life in the Islands.  Hee also founded the Hawaii Watercolor and Serigraph Society.

Hon Chew Hee also studied in New York at the Art Students League, at Columbia University, and spent three years in Paris in the 1950s studying with Fernand Léger and Andre Lhote.  He was especially greatly influenced by the art of Jean Arp.

From 1932 to the beginning of World War II, Hee lived in San Francisco, where he founded the Chinese Art Association.  For the remainder of his life, he lived in Kaneohe, on the Hawaiian island of Oahu, where he died in 1993.

Hee completed six murals for the Hawaii State Foundation on Culture and the Arts, the best known of which are The History of Medicine in Hilo Hospital and the murals that greet departing travelers at the Inter-island Terminal of Honolulu International Airport.  His other murals were painted for Manoa Library, Enchanted Lake Elementary School, Pukalani Elementary School, and Mililani Library.  He also produced entirely abstract works, such as Sunrise Koolau in the collection of the Hawaii State Art Museum.  The Hawaii State Art Museum, the Hawaii State Capitol, the Honolulu Museum of Art, the National Taiwan Museum and the Nelson-Atkins Museum of Art (Kansas City, Missouri) and are among the public collections holding works by Hon Chew Hee.

References
 Chang, Gordon H., Mark Dean Johnson, Paul J. Karlstrom & Sharon Spain, Asian American Art, a History, 1850-1970, Stanford University Press, pp. 325–326
 Forbes, David W., "Encounters with Paradise: Views of Hawaii and its People, 1778-1941", Honolulu Academy of Arts, 1992, 263.
 Haar, Francis and Neogy, Prithwish, "Artists of Hawaii: Nineteen Painters and Sculptors", University of Hawaii Press, 1974, 66-73.
 Hartwell, Patricia L. (editor), Retrospective 1967-1987, Hawaii State Foundation on Culture and the Arts, Honolulu, Hawaii, 1987, p. 32
 Morse, Morse (ed.), Honolulu Printmakers, Honolulu, HI, Honolulu Academy of Arts, 2003, p. 28, 
 Radford, Georgia and Warren Radford, "Sculpture in the Sun, Hawaii's Art for Open Spaces", University of Hawaii Press, 1978, 93.
 Yoshihara, Lisa A., Collective Visions, 1967-1997, Hawaii State Foundation on Culture and the Arts, Hawaii, 1997, 142-143.

Footnotes

American muralists
1906 births
1993 deaths
American watercolorists
People from Maui
San Francisco Art Institute alumni
Art Students League of New York alumni
Columbia University alumni
Printmakers from Hawaii
20th-century American painters
American male painters
20th-century American printmakers
20th-century American male artists